WCAA may refer to:

 WCAA-LP, a radio station (107.3 FM) licensed to serve Albany, New York, United States
 WXNY-FM, a radio station (96.3 FM) licensed to serve New York, New York, which held the call sign WCAA in 2009
 WQXR-FM, a radio station (105.9 FM) licensed to serve Newark, New Jersey, United States, which held the call sign WCAA from 1998 to 2007 and from 2007 to 2009
 Western Collegiate Athletic Association